Berekvam Station is a railway station in Aurland, Norway, on the Flåm Line. The station opened on 1 August 1940 and has the only passing loop on the railway line.

References
Bibliography

Notes

Railway stations on the Flåm Line
Railway stations in Aurland
Railway stations opened in 1940
1940 establishments in Norway